The 2022–2023 mpox outbreak in Taiwan is a part of the larger outbreak of human mpox caused by the West African clade of the monkeypox virus. According to the Centers for Disease Control, Taiwan's first mpox case was reported on 24 June 2022.

As of March 2023, there have been eight confirmed cases of mpox in Taiwan. Five cases were imported, and three cases were domestically transmitted.

Background 

An ongoing outbreak of mpox was confirmed on 6 May 2022, beginning with a British resident who, after travelling to Nigeria (where the disease is endemic), presented symptoms consistent with mpox on 29 April 2022. The resident returned to the United Kingdom on 4 May, creating the country's index case of the outbreak. The origin of several of the cases of mpox in the United Kingdom is unknown. Some monitors saw community transmission taking place in the London area as of mid-May, but it has been suggested that cases were already spreading in Europe in the previous months.

Timeline 

The first known case of the mpox outbreak in Taiwan was detected on 24 June 2022. According to the Centers for Disease Control, the case was a Taiwanese man in his 20s who had traveled to Germany for his studies. He returned to Taiwan on 16 June, started showing symptoms on 20 June, and tested positive for mpox on 24 June. On 12 July, Taiwan reported its second case of mpox in a man in his 30s who had gone on a business trip to the United States. On 6 August, a third case of imported mpox was reported, involving a man in his 20s who had returned to Taiwan from the United States. The fourth imported case, reported on 9 October, involved a man in his 40s who had visited Canada, and developed symptoms in the United States.  The fifth case was reported on 15 February 2023. By March 2023, the disease was confirmed to have been domestically transmitted.

Responses 
In May 2022, the Taiwan Centers for Disease Control started increasing monitoring for mpox cases. Later that month, health minister Chen Shih-chung stated that Taiwan was not yet planning to purchase a mpox vaccine.

As the global outbreak spread, Taiwan designated mpox as a category 2 communicable disease on 23 June. Two days after the index case was publicized, the CDC issued guidelines for risk assessment and control. By 27 June, the CDC had begun working to reverse the vaccine policy declared in May, stating that talks to acquire mpox medications and vaccines had started. Later on 30 June, the CDC issued a travel warning for 44 countries that had reported cases of mpox. On 2 July, the CDC announced that they are planning to receive third-generation smallpox vaccines and antiviral drugs in late 2022. The CDC said that frontline medical workers and researchers will be the first to receive the vaccine. On 24 July, the CDC announced that they signed a contract to purchase medication to treat mpox patients, and that a shipment will arrive in August at the earliest. The CDC also announced that they are in talks to purchase mpox vaccines, and that they are hoping to receive them by late August. On 27 July, 504 courses of mpox medications arrived in Taiwan, to be used by severe cases and immunocompromised individuals. On 1 September, Taiwan received its first doses of the mpox vaccine.

Statistics

Total cases and deaths

New cases per day

Notes

References

Taiwan
Mpox
Mpox